Paul McGrath (born 23 May 1966) is an Irish former Gaelic footballer. In a career that spanned two decades he played at club level with Bishopstown and at inter-county level with the Cork senior football team.

Career

McGrath first came to prominence at underage level with Bishopstown before spending over a decade lining out for the club's senior team. He first appeared on the inter-county scene as a member of the Cork under-21 team, winning successive All-Ireland Under-21 Championship titles in 1985 and 1986. McGrath subsequently joined the Cork senior football team and won the first of five Munster Championship title in his debut season in 1988. He later added a National League title to his collection before claiming successive All-Ireland medals at right corner-forward in 1989 and 1990. McGrath was an All-Star-winner for the latter victory.

Honours

University College Cork
Sigerson Cup: 1988

Cork
All-Ireland Senior Football Championship: 1989, 1990
Munster Senior Football Championship: 1988, 1989, 1990, 1994, 1995
National Football League: 1988-89
All-Ireland Under-21 Football Championship: 1985, 1986
Munster Under-21 Football Championship: 1985, 1986

References

1966 births
Living people
Bishopstown Gaelic footballers
Cork inter-county Gaelic footballers
Munster inter-provincial Gaelic footballers
Winners of two All-Ireland medals (Gaelic football)